Old Man Minick is a short story by American author Edna Ferber first published in 1922. It was adapted into Minick, a Broadway play staged in 1924, as well as the 1925 silent film Welcome Home, the 1932 film The Expert, and the 1939 film No Place to Go.

Background
In the 1910s and 1920s, women's magazines published fiction by well-known writers, including Edith Wharton, Somerset Maugham, and Edna Ferber. During this era, the short story "Old Man Minick" was one of a variety of works first published serially in women's periodicals and then developed into plays and film. Ferber was inspired to write the story after listening to three old men on a park bench in Washington Park in Chicago as they talked about life.

Plot
The story is set in Chicago in the early 20th century, where a seventy year widower, Jo Minick, has to learn how to live, after the unexpected death of his wife, with whom he had been married to for forty years.  Following her death he goes to live with his son, George and daughter-in-law, Nettie. He joins a club in Washington Park, where he meets with other widowers. The group is divided in their opinions as to which are happier, those who live with their children and those who live in aged care facilities. One day Minick overhears Nettie telling her friends that she can't have a child because she is looking after her father-in-law. Soon after Minick tells Nettie that he is moving to a nursing home and Nettie realises the he has heard her conversation. The story ends with Minick discovering that he enjoys his life at the old people's home because he has his freedom to do what he wants.

Play
The story was adapted into the 1924 Broadway play, Minick, by Ferber and George S. Kaufman, and published by Doubleday, Page & Company, in 1924. 

The play had an African American actress, Emma Wise, cast as the Minicks' maid. This was unusual for plays of the segregation era. O. P. Heggie portrayed Minick in the 1924 show.

Film adaptations
Famous Players-Lasky adapted the play into the 1925 silent film Welcome Home, directed by James Cruze. Warner Brothers produced the 1932 film The Expert. In 1939, Terry O. Morse directed the adaptation No Place to Go, starring Dennis Morgan.

Publication history
The story was republished in Ferber's 1947 short story collection One Basket, and the 1955 anthology, The Golden Argosy: The Most Celebrated Short Stories in the English Language.

References

External links
Minick on IBDB.

20th-century American literature
Short stories
Serials (publishing)
Short stories adapted into plays
Short stories adapted into films
1924 plays
Plays set in Chicago
Plays by Edna Ferber
Plays by George S. Kaufman
Broadway plays
American plays adapted into films
Comedy plays